Corcyra is Latin for Corfu, a Greek island in the Ionian Sea.

Corcyra or Korkyra may also refer to:

 Korkyra (mythology), a mythical figure whose name was given to the Greek island

Places 
 Korkyra (polis), the ancient city on the island of Corfu
 Korkyra (Acarnania), a city  founded in ancient Acarnania by Corinthians in 706 BC. See List of cities in ancient Acarnania
 Corcyre, a former French department (1797-1799) in present Greece
 Corcyra Nigra or Korkyra Melaina, ancient name of Korčula island, in Croatia, also known as Black Corcyra

Insects 
 Corcyra cephalonica, the rice moth
 Corcyra nidicolella, a type of snout moth
 Corcyra brunnea, a type of snout moth
 Corcyra, a type of snout moth
 Corcyra asthenitis, a type of snout moth
 Corcyranillus, a genus of beetles

Horses 
Corcyra, one of the UK's top stallions, a sire of Cleopatra